Michael Egan may refer to:

 Michael Egan (Australian politician) (born 1948)
 Michael Egan (author) (born 1941), scholar of literature
 Michael Egan (Irish politician) (1866–1947), Irish trade unionist and Teachta Dála
 Michael Egan (playwright) author of The Dominant Sex (1934)
 Michael Egan (Wisconsin politician), state senator
 Michael Francis Egan (1761–1814), first Catholic bishop of Philadelphia
 Michael J. Egan (1926–2016), American politician